Pal's Sudden Service, normally called Pal's for short, is a regional fast food restaurant chain located in northeast Tennessee and southwestern Virginia, with stores concentrated in the Tri-Cities, Tennessee metro region.  The first Pal's opened in 1956 in Kingsport, Tennessee a year after the founder of Pal's, Fred "Pal" Barger, attended a National Restaurant Convention in Chicago and met Ray Kroc and Fred Turner, observing the construction and equipment they used for the first McDonald's restaurant. Pal's CEO is Thom Crosby. In 2020, the company had 30  locations.

In 2001, Pal's won the Malcolm Baldrige National Quality Award, becoming the first restaurant company to receive the award.

Organizational culture
The organization is often studied by competition and used as a case study for Industrial/Organizational Psychologists. This is per the company's unique organizational culture, with training that includes pop quizzes and over 200 hours of training for employees, which results in significantly low turnover for the industry.

Aesthetics
Pal's drive-throughs are recognized by their novelty architecture in the form of large replicas of food items placed on the roof. Added in 1985, these were designed by California artists Karen and Tony Barone. In addition to the novelty architecture, the buildings are typically painted a bright, cyan blue color, which adds to the visual distinction.

Company history
1956 -	First Pal’s opened Kingsport #01
1960 - Lynn Garden Drive Pal's ....  this was 2nd Pal's....... still open in 2020
1967 - Brook's Circle Pal's #03(a different building & location than Pal's #12) The earliest drive thru called Circle Burger.
1985 -	First box/tier design drive thrus open in Kingsport. Pal's #03 in Colonial Heights.
1987 Pal’s invents the “Big Tea.”
1990 -	Pal's #05 opened in Johnson City near ETSU
1991 -	Greeneville #06 and Gate City #07
1992 -	Pal's Johnson City Mall #08 and Elizabethton #09
1993 -	Pal's #10 Volunteer Parkway
1994 -	Pal's #11 Bristol Highway
1995 -	Pal's Brook's Circle #12 and Rogersville #13
1997 -	Pal's Morristown #14 Pals Celebrates the 10th year of the “Big Tea”
1998 -	Pal's #15 in Church Hill and Big Breakfast Introduced
1999 -	Pal's opens in Bristol at Exit 7 #16
2001 -	Pal's Wins Baldrige National Quality Award
2002 -	President Bush presents Pal's the Baldrige Award
2003 -	Two new Pal's, Gray #18 and Blountville #19.
2006 - Pal's opens in Jonesborough Pal's #20.
2007 - Pal's celebrates the 20th year of the "Big Tea"
2008 - Pal's opens in Lebanon, Virginia #21
2008 - Founder Pal Barger is on board the MS Nautica when it is attacked by pirates in the Gulf of Aden.
2009 - Pal's opens in Greeneville #22
2009 - Pal's introduces Razzie Tea
2009 - Neon sign at Pal's #2 taken down due to high costs of operation
2010 - Pal's opens in Norton, Virginia. #23 It has the biggest opening in Pal's history.
2012 - Pal's introduces new 3D website http://www.palsweb.com Pal's #24 Boone's Creek opened.
2013 - Pal's opened Pal's #25 Jefferson City and Pal's #26 Erwin, Tennessee locations.
2015 - Pal's opened Pal's #27 Bristol, Tennessee & Pal's #28 Morristown East
2016 - Pal's opened Pal's #29 Sunset Drive, Johnson City
2017 - Pal’s celebrates the 30th year of the “Big Tea”
2019 - Pal’s Celebrates 10th year of “Razzie Tea.”
2020 - Pal’s opened store #30 in Abingdon 
2020 - Area celebrates the 90th Birthday of founder Pal Barger.
2020 - Founder Pal Barger passed away on 10/29

References

External links
 Official website

Regional restaurant chains in the United States
Fast-food hamburger restaurants
Companies based in Tennessee
Kingsport, Tennessee
Restaurants in Tennessee
Restaurants in Virginia
Restaurants established in 1956
1956 establishments in Tennessee